The Lokmanya Express is an Express train belonging to Indian Railways that run between Gorakhpur Junction and Lokmanya Tilak Terminus, Kurla (Mumbai) in India. It operates as train number 11080 from Gorakhpur Junction to Lokmanya Tilak Terminus and as train number 11079 in the reverse direction.

Service

The 11079/Mumbai LTT - Gorakhpur Lokmanya Express (Via Barhni) has an average speed of 52 km/hr and covers 1746 km in 33 hrs 40 mins. 11080/Gorakhpur - Mumbai LTT Lokmanya Express (via Barhni) has an average speed of 50 km/hr and 1746 km in 34 hrs 50 mins.

Route and halts 

The important halts of the train are:

Coach composite

The train consists of 23 coaches :

 1 AC II Tier
 3 AC III Tier
 13 Sleeper Coaches
 4 General
 2 Second-class Luggage/parcel van

Traction

Both trains are hauled by a Bhusaval Loco Shed based WAP-5 electric locomotive from Kurla to Lucknow and from Lucknow it is hauled by a Gonda Loco Shed based WDM 3A diesel locomotive up til Gorakhpur.

Direction Reversal

Train Reverses its direction 1 times:

Notes

External links 

 11079/Mumbai LTT - Gorakhpur Lokmanya Express (Via Barhni)
 11080/Gorakhpur - Mumbai LTT Lokmanya Express (via Barhni)

References 

Named passenger trains of India
Rail transport in Madhya Pradesh
Rail transport in Maharashtra
Passenger trains originating from Gorakhpur
Transport in Mumbai
Railway services introduced in 2015
Express trains in India